Raymond Barion (born 1946, Valkenburg aan de Geul) is a Dutch artist who lives and works in Antwerp, Belgium. For the past 40 years he has been making art in the form of paintings, sculptures and work on paper.

Biography 
Barion studied sculpture at the National Institute for Fine Arts in Antwerp en and achieved a master's degree in Art History at Ghent University. After he graduated in 1974, he became a professor of contemporary art at the Academy of Art and Design St. Joost in Breda, the Netherlands. Barion worked here until his retirement in 2010.

Barion has made, next to his part-time job as a professor, several drawings, sculptures and paintings. His paintings are usually very large and painted with the airbrush technique. His paintings contain different spatial perspectives and other architectural elements.

In the 1980s Barion exhibited at the Technical University of Delft, the Technical University of Eindhoven, Freidus/Ordover Gallery in New York and the International Cultural Center in Antwerp. In 2014 he had a solo exhibition at Extra City Kunsthal in Antwerp. His solo exhibition Isometric Landscapes (2016) at Upstream Gallery in Amsterdam got attention in the Dutch media.

Selected exhibitions 
 'Parallel Perspectives', Kunstfort bij Vijfhuizen (2017)
 'Less is a Bore', KAI 10, Arthena Foundation, Düsseldorf (2016)
 'Isometric Landscapes', Upstream Gallery Amsterdam (2016)
 'Machines Célibataires: 100 jaar later', Pictura Tekengenootschap, Dordrecht (2015)
 'Of Lenses and Arenas', Extra City Kunsthal, Antwerpen (2014)
 'Isometrische Landschappen', Technische Universiteit Eindhoven (1984)
 'Machinale Metamorfosen', Technische Universiteit Delft (1983)

References

External links 
 Website Upstream Gallery, die Raymond Barion vertegenwoordigt
 Website Extra City Antwerpen

1946 births
Living people
20th-century Dutch painters
21st-century Dutch painters
Dutch art historians
Dutch sculptors
Ghent University alumni
People from Valkenburg aan de Geul